The 2018 World Series was the championship series of Major League Baseball's 2018 season.

2018 World Series may also refer to:

 2018 Little League World Series (baseball)
 2018 Intermediate League World Series (baseball)
 2018 Junior League World Series (baseball)
 2018 Senior League World Series (baseball)
 2018 College World Series (baseball)
 2018 World Club Series (rugby league)
 2018 World Series of Poker
 2018 Fast5 Netball World Series